"Life in a Northern Town" is the debut single by British band The Dream Academy, released in March 1985. It is from their self-titled debut studio album The Dream Academy. The song was written as an elegy to British folk musician Nick Drake. Written by band members Nick Laird-Clowes and Gilbert Gabriel, the song was produced by Laird-Clowes with help from Pink Floyd guitarist David Gilmour. The single reached No. 7 on the US Billboard Hot 100 chart in February 1986. It is the band's highest charting single in the UK, the US, and Ireland. A cover version released in 2008 and recorded live by the American country music artists Sugarland, Little Big Town, and Jake Owen was also a minor American hit that year.

Original version
The Dream Academy released the original version of "Life in a Northern Town" as a single in 1985. The song appeared on their self-titled album. The single peaked at number seven on the US charts.

Composition
"Life in a Northern Town" was written as an elegy to British folk musician Nick Drake, who died in 1974.

Gilbert Gabriel, a member of the Dream Academy and co-writer of "Life in a Northern Town,” said that the inspiration for the tune came from his experience at Dartington College of Arts.

The song, which took a year to record, includes elements of classical music, an "African-esque" chant of "hey ma ma ma ma,” which was later sampled by dance duo Dario G for their track "Sunchyme" and by the duo Tritonal, and hints of psychedelia. The song is written in the key of E major with a main chord pattern of E-A-E.

Track listing
7" single
"Life in a Northern Town" – 4:17
"Test Tape No. 3" – 5:01

12" single
"Life in a Northern Town" (Extended) – 5:19
"Test Tape No. 3" – 5:03
"Life in a Northern Town" (7" Mix) – 4:14
"Poised on the Edge of Forever" – 3:32

Music video
Two videos were released to promote the single.  The earlier version features the group performing the song in various locations in Hebden Bridge, West Yorkshire.  The second version, released in November 1985, features the group performing at a concert while clips play featuring footage of Newcastle upon Tyne, Manchester, and Aliquippa, Pennsylvania.

Chart history

Weekly Charts

Year-end Charts

Sugarland cover version

The song was covered in 2007 by the country music duo Sugarland, along with Little Big Town and Jake Owen, on the Sugarland Change for Change Tour. A live performance from 2007 was made into a music video by Becky Fluke for the network Country Music Television.

This performance was included on the Deluxe Fan Edition of Sugarland's 2008 album Love on the Inside and on Capitol Records' late 2008 re-release of Little Big Town's 2007 album A Place to Land. It was nominated for Vocal Event of the Year at the Country Music Association awards, Best Country Collaboration with Vocals at the 51st Grammy Awards, and Vocal Event of the Year at the 44th Annual Academy of Country Music awards.

Chart positions

Other versions
 In 2005, Rick Springfield made a version of the song on the covers album The Day After Yesterday.

In popular culture 
The song was featured in the Season 3 King of the Hill episode "Wings of the Dope."

References

External links
Video of Sugarland version at CMT

1984 songs
1985 debut singles
2008 singles
Songs written by Nick Laird-Clowes
The Dream Academy songs
British new wave songs
Baroque pop songs
New wave ballads
Rock ballads
Pop ballads
Sugarland songs
Little Big Town songs
Jake Owen songs
Warner Records singles
Mercury Records singles
Song recordings produced by Byron Gallimore
Blanco y Negro Records singles
Music videos directed by Tim Pope
Song recordings produced by David Gilmour
Songs about musicians
Commemoration songs
Vocal collaborations
Nick Drake